Belitsa is a town in southwestern Bulgaria, located in the Belitsa Municipality of the province of Blagoevgrad.

Geography
Belitsa is close to Razlog Municipality, Yakoruda Municipality, and Bansko Municipality. The municipality of Belinitsa is picturesquely situated in the northeastern part of the Razlog Valley in the Blagoevgrad region, in the dale of the river Mesta, in between the southern slopes of Eastern Rila and the northern slopes of the Beliyshko-Videnishki part of the western Rhodopes.

It contains 12 settlements, and 8 of them are scattered in the mountainous area of the Rhodopes. The municipal centre, Belitsa, is located in the southern part of the Rila mountains and is connected to the route Razlog-Velingrad (with international E79 and E80) but off to the side by 4 kilometres. This makes for easy transportation from the town to Sofia (172 kilometres away) and Blagoevgrad (72 kilometres away).

History

The area of Belitsa first fell into the hands of the Roman Empire. The Romans made many settlements larger in the Razlog valley and led Hellenized and Romanized colonists into them.

Belitsa is recorded for the first time in a record from the Tatarpazardzhiyska province (kaaza) in the Ottoman Empire in 1516 under the name Belitsa, together with Little Belitsa (Malka Belitsa).

In the 19th century, it was a Christian-Muslim village in the Nevropska kaaza of the Ottoman Empire. In "The Ethnography of the Vilayets Adrianopole, Manastir, and Salonica" in Constantinople (now Istanbul) in 1878 and statistics reflecting the male population from 1873, Belitsa (Bielitsa) is shown as a village with 303 households, 640 Bulgarian Christians and 250 Pomaks. In agreement with the statistics of Vasil Kanchov, during c. 1900, Belitsa (in old Bulgarian orthography Бѣлица) is a mixed Bulgarian-Christian and Bulgarian-Muslim village. 2700 Bulgarian Christians live in it, as well as 550 Pomaks and 50 Vlachs.

During 1833-1855, under the control of Pope Iliya, the church "Saint George" is built. Construction was unusually slow because of the unwillingness of the then-in-power Turkish local government, which would often destroy what progress the Christians had made. The church was built contrary to the laws of the empire, in a high and visible part of the village. Its domes were visible from everywhere. As a compromise, Belitsan Christians convinced the local authority to bring an mount a clock face from Vienna, which would be mounted on the highest dome. It was bought from Vienna with natural products (cheese, wool and others).

During 1903, during the Ilinden-Preobrazhenie Uprising, the church was burned down and the clock fell to the ground, stopping at 16:00. Its parts were collected by the Bulgarian Muslim Irlovets and later returned to the returning Christians with the purpose to be returned to its old place. According to one legend—which Belitsa is full of—Levski came to Pope Danail's house in Belitsa after the pope fictitiously invited him to marry his daughter so he would come to the village. After that, a revolutionary organisation was formed in the village to ready the Christian population for the April Uprising.

During the Russo-Turkish War from 1877–78, under the Samara flag, 19 Belitsan volunteers fought at Svishtov, Rousse, Sheinovo and Shipka. They returned to their village with many medals and honors and were received with delight from their neighbours. Belitsan volunteers were also involved in the Kresna-Razlog Uprising as well as the training and fighting at Razlog. A large number of the volunteers were sent to prison or forced to leave the village.

In 1891, Georgi Strezov wrote of Belitsa:

Georgi Strezov also wrote about the neighbourhood of Belitsa, Kuru Dere. On the road from Yakoruda to Belitsa and in 1891, Strezov wrote that there are 10 Pomak houses with around 50 people.

During 1903, because of its active participationin  the Ilinden Uprising, Belitsa was burned to the ground. Over 475 people died.

After the beginning of the First Balkan War, 49 people from Belitsa took part in the Macedonian-Adrianople volunteer regiments.

After the Second Balkan War in 1913, Belitsa remains in Bulgarian territory. According to Dimitar Gadzhanov, in 1916, Belitsa was a mixed Bulgarian-Pomak village, the Pomaks numbering around 400.

During 1920 in Belitsa, the Forest Labour Production Cooperative "Rila Planina" is formed. In 1935, it has 480 members.

Economy

The local economy is based primarily on small workshops in the wood processing and sewing industries. The NSI reports that in the territory of the municipality, there are 150 registered businesses, the largest being the ones related to transportation, repair, and service (totaling 36.6%), followed by the manufacturing industries (24.3%), and hotel and restaurant service (around 18%), primarily in the neighbourhood Semkovo. The lowest percentage is that of businesses involved with village, hunting and forest economy, at 4.3%. The structure of the businesses follow the general tendency for the province and the country.

The industry in the municipality is made up of businesses specializing in logging and wood processing, which rely on the availability of raw materials, equipment and personnel. Arable land is 54.2% of farming territories and is in total 34,203 decares. Its relative share of the total area of the municipality is 11.7%; about 4 times less than the national average ( 44.8% ). 3.6 acres of farmland are available per capita, while the country average is 6.3 hectares per person.

Belitsa municipality is part of the program ""Sustainable Development of Forestry, Agriculture and Alternative Tourism", as well as the United Nations Development Programme during the 2003-2007 period. The main aim is an efficient and conscientious combination of economic, social, and ecological development. During 2002, "A Strategy for the Development of Village Tourism" is put into place. Under it, explorations are conducted and many attractions and objects of interest are marked for tourist development.

Public institutions
The community centre Georgi Todorov has a history spanning over a century. It was created as the workshop "Zora" during 1885 by the returning war volunteers, which brought Russian books from free Bulgaria, with which to enlighten Belitsans. In addition to its workshop activities, the builders used it to develop the revolution against the Ottomans. The local Turkish authorities forbade its use, but books were still being provided by the local citizens. From then on, it contained many books pertaining to folklore of the region.

Notable residents

 Todor Saev of the Internal Macedonia-Adrianopole Revolutionary Organization (Vatreshna Makedono-Odrinska Revolyutsionna Organizatsia) and the Supreme Macedonia-Adrianople Committee (Varhoven Makedono-Odrinski Komitet)
 Vladimir Poptomov, the American-Soviet-Bulgarian politician
 George Andreytchine, journalist, trade union organiser and diplomat
 Nikola Aleksiev, folklorist
 İbrahim Ethem Akıncı, Turkish Guerrilla Leader of the Demirci Akindjis against the Greek Invasion of Anatolia and Bureaucrat.

Religion
Belitsa's population is mixed, with both Christians and Muslims.

Points of interest
The town's historical museum was opened in 1995, and contains an ethnographic exhibit and an exhibit-shop for local fabrics and crafts.

The Dancing Bears Park, a rescue centre for former dancing bears, is located just outside the town.

Honour
Belitsa Peninsula on Graham Land in Antarctica is named after Belitsa.

References

External links
 Dancing Bears Rehabilitation Park tourist overview
 Awarded "EDEN - European Destinations of Excellence" non traditional tourist destination 2009

Towns in Bulgaria
Populated places in Blagoevgrad Province